Mario Bermejo Castanedo (born 7 October 1978) is a Spanish retired professional footballer who played as a striker.

A veteran in the Segunda División, he amassed totals of 267 games and 73 goals for eight clubs over nine seasons. In La Liga he played for Racing de Santander, Athletic Bilbao, Recreativo, Xerez and Celta, scoring 12 goals for Xerez and 17 in total.

Club career
Bermejo was born in Santander, Cantabria. In his early years he played one game each in La Liga with Racing de Santander and Athletic Bilbao, and then went on to represent teams in the lower leagues on loan. His official debut with Athletic came in a 1997–98 UEFA Cup match at U.C. Sampdoria, playing the final 32 minutes in the place of Ismael Urzaiz in an eventual 2–1 win; he was deemed eligible to play for the team because of his father's Basque roots and an uncle's connections to the club hierarchy.

For the 2002–03 season, Bermejo was released by Athletic and returned to the top flight with Recreativo de Huelva. In 2004–05, he was instrumental in helping Racing de Ferrol retain its status, ending the campaign as top scorer with 25 goals – this included four past UD Almería in a 6–1 away victory, Ferrol's biggest ever in that league.

The following campaigns were also spent in the second division, with Albacete Balompié and Almería. He scored five league goals for the Andalusians in 2006–07, helping them to reach the top tier for the first time ever.

After a season-long loan at Polideportivo Ejido, Bermejo was released and joined another side in the region, Xerez CD. 2008–09 was highly productive both collectively (promotion, also a first-ever) and individually (12 league goals, third-best in the squad, to Momo's 17 and Antoñito's 13), and the player, aged 30, agreed to a new two-year contract. They were immediately relegated the following campaign, but the player ranked amongst the league's top scorers at 12, also netting in the last minute of a 2–1 home win against Almería on 1 May 2010.

Bermejo signed with division two's RC Celta de Vigo in late June 2011. He contributed eight goals from 35 appearances – 30 starts – in his first season as the Galicians returned to the top flight after five years, his third promotion. In July 2014 the 35-year-old retired from the game, and was immediately appointed director of football at his last club.

Honours
Xerez
Segunda División: 2008–09

Individual
Segunda División top scorer: 2004–05

References

External links

1978 births
Living people
Spanish people of Basque descent
Footballers from Santander, Spain
Spanish footballers
Association football forwards
La Liga players
Segunda División players
Segunda División B players
Tercera División players
Rayo Cantabria players
Racing de Santander players
Bilbao Athletic footballers
Athletic Bilbao footballers
Cultural Leonesa footballers
SD Eibar footballers
Gimnástica de Torrelavega footballers
CE L'Hospitalet players
Recreativo de Huelva players
Racing de Ferrol footballers
Albacete Balompié players
UD Almería players
Polideportivo Ejido footballers
Xerez CD footballers
RC Celta de Vigo players
Spain youth international footballers